Connie Ramsay (born 24 February 1988) is a Scottish judoka, who competed at the Commonwealth Games.

Judo career
Ramsay became champion of Great Britain, winning the lightweight division at the British Judo Championships in 2012.

Ramsay competed at the 2014 Commonwealth Games, where she won a bronze medal in the 57 kg event.

References

1988 births
Living people
Scottish female judoka
Judoka at the 2014 Commonwealth Games
Commonwealth Games medallists in judo
Commonwealth Games bronze medallists for Scotland
Sportspeople from Inverness
Medallists at the 2014 Commonwealth Games